"Come Along Now" is a song by Greek singer Despina Vandi released by Heaven Music in 2004. In the spring of 2004, Phoebus teamed up with Coca-Cola to compose the tune that will accompany all of Coca-Cola’s activities in its Olympic sponsorship agreement. Phoebus composed the song "Come Along Now" with Despina Vandi singing it, and the tune was heard all around the world in Coca-Cola's ads.

Music video
The music video for "Come Along Now" was once again directed by Kostas Kapetanidis. It features Vandi in three different scenes: posing in a photoshoot, lying down, and caught in a rope animal trap. The other scene in the video is of people dancing in a club, with frequent advertisements for Coca-Cola. Phoebus makes a cameo appearance in the video overseeing Vandi's photoshoot.

Track listing
Greek release
"Come Along Now" (English Version) (Rap: Bo) - 3:51
"Come Along Now" (Greek-English Version) (Rap: Giannis Patelis) - 3:51
"Phoebus Band Remix" - 5:54
"Paralos" (Instrumental) - 3:20
Greek re-release
"Come Along Now" (English Version) - 3:51
"Phoebus Band Remix" - 5:54
"Paralos" (Instrumental) - 3:20
"Come Along VS Gia" (Radio Edit) - 4:38
"Come Along VS Gia" (Extended Mix) - 6:06
US release
"Come Along Now" (Original Radio Edit) - 3:14
"Come Along Now VS. Gia" (Radio Edit) - 4:39
"Come Along Now VS. Gia" (Extended) - 6:08
"Phoebus Band Mix" - 5:55
"Come Along Now" (Instrumental) - 3:52
US release (12")
"Phoebus Band Remix" - 5:55
"Come Along Now" (Radio Edit) - 3:54
"Come Along Now VS Gia" (Extended Version) - 6:06
"Come Along Now" (Instrumental) - 3:51
Spanish release
"Come Along Now" (XTM Airplay Remix) - 4:15
"Come Along Now" (XTM Extended Club Remix) - 6:04
"Come Along Now" (Original Greek-English Version) - 3:53

Charts and certifications

Weekly charts

Year-end charts

Certifications

Release history

References

2004 singles
Number-one singles in Greece
Despina Vandi songs
Music videos directed by Kostas Kapetanidis
Songs written by Phoebus (songwriter)
2004 songs